Robert Dudley Baxter (3 February 1827, Doncaster – 1875, Frognal) was an English economist and statistician.

Life
Robert Dudley Baxter was educated privately and at Trinity College, Cambridge University. He studied law and entered his father's firm of Baxter & Co., solicitors, with which he was connected until his death. Though studiously attentive to business, he was enabled, as a member of the Statistical and other learned societies, to accomplish much useful economic work.

Works
His principal economic writings were:
The Budget and the Income Tax, 1860
Railway Extension and its Results, 1866
The Panic of 1866; With its Lessons on the Currency Act, 1866
The National Income, 1868
The Taxation of the United Kingdom, 1869
National Debts of the World, 1871
Local Government and Taxation, 1874

His purely political writings included:
The Volunteer Movement, 1860
The Redistribution of Seats and the Counties, 1866
History of English Parties and Conservatism, 1870
The Political Progress of the Working Classes, 1871

Notes

References

1827 births
1875 deaths
English economists
Alumni of Trinity College, Cambridge